Constantin Dorian Arbănaş  (born 28 July 1983) is a Romanian retired footballer.

Honours
Sheriff Tiraspol
 Divizia Naţională: 2006–07, 2007–08, 2008–09, 2009–10
 Moldovan Cup: 2008, 2009, 2010
 Moldovan Super Cup: 2007
CIS Cup: 2009
Khazar Lankaran
 Azerbaijan Cup: 2010–11
Milsami Orhei
 Moldovan Cup: 2012

External links
 Profile at moldova.sports.md
 
 

1983 births
Living people
Sportspeople from Reșița
Romanian footballers
Association football defenders
CS Minaur Baia Mare (football) players
Liga I players
ACF Gloria Bistrița players
Azerbaijan Premier League players
Khazar Lankaran FK players
Moldovan Super Liga players
FC Sheriff Tiraspol players
FC Sfîntul Gheorghe players
FC Milsami Orhei players
CSF Bălți players
FC Rapid Ghidighici players
Romanian expatriate footballers
Romanian expatriate sportspeople in Azerbaijan
Expatriate footballers in Azerbaijan
Romanian expatriate sportspeople in Moldova
Expatriate footballers in Moldova
Romanian football managers